José Díaz Sánchez (born 20 April 1980 in Almodóvar del Río, Córdoba), commonly known as Pepe Díaz, is a Spanish retired footballer who played as a striker.

External links

1980 births
Living people
Sportspeople from the Province of Córdoba (Spain)
Spanish footballers
Footballers from Andalusia
Association football forwards
Segunda División players
Segunda División B players
Tercera División players
Córdoba CF players
CD Pozoblanco players
Novelda CF players
Córdoba CF B players
FC Cartagena footballers
Écija Balompié players
CD Guadalajara (Spain) footballers
Real Oviedo players
Lucena CF players